Poly(A) binding protein, cytoplasmic 4-like is a protein that in humans is encoded by the PABPC4L gene.

References

Further reading 

Genes
Human proteins